ELP Communications (formerly known as T.A.T. Communications Company, Embassy Television, Embassy Telecommunications, and Embassy Communications) was an American television production company that originally began in 1974.

History

Beginning

ELP Communications was originally formed in 1974 as T.A.T. Communications Company when Norman Lear joined up with former talent agent Jerry Perenchio, a year before Bud Yorkin ended his partnership with Lear. "T.A.T." stood for the Yiddish phrase "Tuchus Affen Tisch", which meant "Putting one's ass on the line."

The first sitcom to be produced by T.A.T. Communications was The Jeffersons, which was spun off from the sitcom All in the Family in 1975.

Acquisition of Avco Embassy and rename

Television producer Norman Lear and his business partner Jerry Perenchio bought Avco Embassy Pictures Corporation in January 1982 and decided to drop the name "Avco" from the name to bring back the name Embassy Pictures and T.A.T. Communications Co. was renamed as Embassy Communications, Inc.

The television division was renamed as Embassy Television, a division name for his shows by the former T.A.T. Communications such as The Jeffersons, One Day at a Time, and The Facts of Life. More shows were produced by Embassy Television such as the first two under the name: Square Pegs and Silver Spoons. The latter show ran five seasons, while the former ran one but developed a cult following. Who's the Boss? was piloted later in 1983 until airing in 1984. Embassy Television also produced Diff'rent Strokess final season from Tandem Productions, which was eventually operated by Embassy.

Embassy also held the TV rights to a majority of the Embassy theatrical library, syndicated under the umbrella title Embassy Night at the Movies. Embassy Telecommunications was the television distribution arm of Embassy Television. They distributed off-net syndicated shows by Embassy Television and those by Tandem Productions and T.A.T. Communications. Tandem's PITS Films was folded into Embassy Telecommunications.

Coca-Cola era
Lear and Perenchio sold Embassy Communications (included Tandem Productions) to The Coca-Cola Company (then-current owners of Columbia Pictures) for $485 million on June 18, 1985. After the sale, Lear, Perenchio, nor Bud Yorkin were no longer involved with Embassy or Tandem. A month later in July 1985, CBS canceled The Jeffersons and Diff'rent Strokes was already canceled by NBC. The latter was later moved to ABC. During the fall, a new sitcom called 227, debuted on NBC.

A year later, Embassy Communications became the only television banner as Embassy's television divisions (Embassy Television, Embassy Telecommunications, and Tandem Productions) were consolidated into the holding company.

When ABC canceled Diff'rent Strokes, the brand name Tandem Productions became dormant but renamed active as an in-name-only division. On November 24, 1986, Coca-Cola fused Embassy's television operations including the movie packages (Embassy Night at the Movies, Embassy II and Embassy III) with Columbia Pictures Television; the combined company became Columbia/Embassy Television, though Columbia and Embassy continued to produce and distribute programs under their separate names. During that formation, Coca-Cola took Columbia and Embassy out of the first-run syndication business and focused them on first-run network and off-net syndication programming. This was also the formation of Coca-Cola Television when Coke regrouped Columbia Pictures Television, Embassy Communications, and Merv Griffin Enterprises. Married... with Children was the next—and as it would transpire, last—successful sitcom by Embassy Communications, debuting as part of the fledgling Fox Broadcasting Company's first primetime lineup in 1987.

Columbia Pictures Entertainment and Sony Pictures Entertainment eras
On December 21, 1987, Coca-Cola sold its Columbia Pictures entertainment businesses to TriStar Pictures, Inc. and renamed the Tri-Star holding company as "Columbia Pictures Entertainment" for $3.1 billion. Columbia/Embassy Television then merged with TriStar Television to form a new version of Columbia Pictures Television. Embassy Communications then became ELP (Embassy Lear Pictures) Communications. Still-running and newer Embassy shows would begin to use the Columbia Pictures Television logo in January 1988 but would use the ELP copyright in the credits in February 1988. Embassy Night at the Movies was renamed as Columbia Night at the Movies. On November 8, 1989, Columbia Pictures Entertainment was sold to Sony and renamed as Sony Pictures Entertainment on August 7, 1991.

The final long running show to be produced by Embassy Television, as ELP Communications, was Beakman's World in 1992. In February 1994, SPE merged Columbia Pictures Television and the newly relaunched TriStar Television to become Columbia TriStar Television. All series by CPT, TriStar, ELP, and Merv Griffin were brought under the banner (though most shows would not begin to use CTT's logo until around 1997). Beakman's World was cancelled in 1998 and ELP Communications became an in-name only unit of Columbia TriStar Television.

Today, television distribution rights to both Embassy's television and theatrical libraries are now owned by Sony Pictures Television. Also, all shows from T.A.T. Communications Company to ELP Communications are all copyrighted by ELP Communications.

Studios and tapings by ELP Communications
The Jeffersons at CBS Television City (1975), Metromedia Square (1975–1982) and Universal Studios by Compact Video (1982–1985)
Hot l Baltimore at ABC Television Center (1975)
One Day at a Time at CBS Television City (1975), Metromedia Square (1975–1982) and Universal Studios by Compact Video (1982–1984)
The Dumplings at The Burbank Studios (1976)
All's Fair at Metromedia Square (1976–1977)
Mary Hartman, Mary Hartman at Metromedia Square (1976–1977)
Fernwood 2 Night at Metromedia Square (1977)
America 2-Night at Metromedia Square (1978)
Hello, Larry at Metromedia Square (1979–1980)
McGurk: A Dog's Life (Pilot) (1979)
The Baxters at Metromedia Square (1979–1981)
The Facts of Life at Metromedia Square (1979–1982), Universal Studios by Compact Video (1982–1985) and Sunset Gower Studios (1985–1988)
Palmerstown, U.S.A. at Metromedia Square (1980–1981)
Silver Spoons at Metromedia Square for pilot (1982), Universal Studios by Compact Video (1982–1985) and Sunset Gower Studios (1985–1987)
Square Pegs on location (1982–1983)
Who's the Boss? at Universal Studios by Compact Video (1983–1985) and ABC Television Center (1985–1992)
a.k.a. Pablo at Universal Studios by Compact Video (1984)
Double Trouble at Universal Studios by Compact Video Season 1, C.C.R. Video Corporation, Sun Television, Compact Video Season 2 (1984–1985) 
E/R at Universal Studios by Compact Video for Pilot, by One Pass Film and Video (1984–1985) by Sun Television (1985) Quality Video (1985)
 Diff'rent Strokes at ABC Television Center (1985-1986, final season only)
The Charmings at ABC Television Center (1987–1988)
Married... with Children at ABC Television Center (1987–1988), Sunset Gower Studios (1988–1994) and Sony Pictures Studios (1994–1997)
Everything's Relative at Unitel Video Inc. New York (1987)
Free Spirit at ABC Television Center (1989–1990)
Phenom at ABC Television Center (1993–1994)

Theatrical release
Blue Collar (1978, as T.A.T. Communications Company and distributed by Universal Pictures)

References

External links
 TAT Communications Company at the Internet Movie Database
 Embassy Television at the Internet Movie Database
 Embassy Telecommunications at the Internet Movie Database
 Embassy Communications at the Internet Movie Database
 ELP Communications at the Internet Movie Database

Television production companies of the United States
Mass media companies established in 1974
Predecessors of Sony Pictures Television
Sony Pictures Television
Sony Pictures Entertainment
1974 establishments in California